Paul Giamatti is an American actor and producer.

Giamatti received an Academy Award nomination for Best Supporting Actor for Ron Howard's Cinderella Man (2005). He has also received six Golden Globe Awards nominations winning twice for John Adams (2008), and Barney's Version (2010). He also received seven Screen Actors Guild Award nominations winning for Sideways (2004), Cinderella Man (2005), John Adams (2008), and Too Big to Fail (2010). For his work on television he has received four Primetime Emmy Award nominations, winning Outstanding Lead Actor in a Limited Series for the HBO series John Adams (2008). He also received Golden Globe Award and Screen Actors Guild Award wins for his performance as well.

Major associations

Academy Awards

Golden Globe Award

Primetime Emmy Awards

Screen Actors Guild Awards

Industry awards

Independent Spirit Awards

Critics Choice Awards

Miscellaneous awards

References 

Giamatti, Paul